Jordan competed at the 2012 Summer Olympics in London, from 27 July to 12 August 2012. This was the nation's ninth consecutive appearance at the Olympics.

The Jordan Olympic Committee sent the nation's second largest delegation to the Games. A total of 10 athletes, equally shared between men and women, competed in 5 sports. Two Jordanian athletes made their second consecutive appearance at the Olympics: equestrian show jumper Ibrahim Besharat, and taekwondo jin Nadin Dawani, who became the nation's third female flag bearer at the opening ceremony. Former Olympic swimmer Samar Nassar also led the Jordanian team as chef de mission. Jordan, however, has yet to win its first ever Olympic medal.

Athletics

Men

Women

Boxing

Jordan has qualified boxers for the following events. 

Men

Equestrian

Jumping
Jordan has qualified an athlete.

Swimming

Jordan has gained two "Universality places" from the FINA.

Men

Women

Taekwondo

Jordan has qualified 3 athletes.

References

Summer Olympics
Nations at the 2012 Summer Olympics
2012